The 1927 LEN European Aquatics Championships were held from 31 August to 4 September in Bologna, Italy. Women's events were held for the first time.

Medal table

Overall

Swimming

Medal summary

Diving
Men's events

Women's events

Swimming
Men's events

Women's events

Legend: WR – World record

Water polo

See also
List of European Championships records in swimming

References

European Championships
European Aquatics Championships
LEN European Aquatics Championships
International aquatics competitions hosted by Italy
European Aquatics
August 1927 sports events
September 1927 sports events